Alvin Lewis may refer to:

Alvin Lewis (Florida State University), President, between 1892 and 1897, of the Seminary West of the Suwannee River, now Florida State University
Alvin Lewis (boxer) (born 1943)

See also
Al Lewis (disambiguation)